Husband is an unincorporated community in Somerset County, Pennsylvania, United States.

History
A post office called Husband was established in 1884, and remained in operation until 1903. The community has the name of Harmon Husband, a pioneer citizen.

References

Unincorporated communities in Somerset County, Pennsylvania
Unincorporated communities in Pennsylvania